Bennacott is a village in east Cornwall, England, in the United Kingdom. It is five miles (8 km) north of Launceston and in the parish of Boyton.

References

External links

Villages in Cornwall